Bitcoin ATMs (Automated Teller Machine) are kiosks that allows a person to purchase Bitcoin and other cryptocurrencies by using cash or debit card. Some Bitcoin ATMs offer bi-directional functionality enabling both the purchase of Bitcoin as well as the sale of Bitcoin for cash. In some cases, Bitcoin ATM providers require users to have an existing account to transact on the machine.

History
On October 29, 2013, a Robocoin machine opened in the Waves coffee shop in downtown Vancouver, Canada. On December 8, 2013, Europe's first Bitcoin ATM was installed in Bratislava, Slovakia. The first machine in the United States went online on February 18, 2014, in a cigar bar in Albuquerque, New Mexico, though it was removed 30 days later. Months later, in May 2014, the first licensed bitcoin ATM in the U.S. was developed by Coinme and installed at the Spitfire Grill in Seattle WA.

Canada
In 2014, Canada was the first country to approve regulation of cryptocurrencies, although it took some time to enforce. In February 2014, the Finance Minister mentioned plans to introduce anti-money laundering and anti-terrorist financing regulations for virtual currencies such as Bitcoin. In June of that year, the Governor General approved an amendment to Bill C-31 that would treat cryptocurrency businesses as Money Services Businesses (MSBs), and the Department of Finance circulated a draft of the proposed regulations in June 2018. As of July 2020, businesses dealing in virtual currencies are considered MSBs by the Financial Transactions and Reports Analysis Centre of Canada.

In 2018, the Canada Revenue Agency (CRA) commissioned an investigation on Bitcoin ATMs to find out if tax laws were being followed by users. From December 2017 to February 2018, the number of Bitcoin ATMs in Canada increased by 20%. In June 2019, Vancouver was considering a ban on the machines due to money-laundering concerns.

Bitcoin Well based in Edmonton became the first publicly traded Bitcoin ATM company on July 30, 2021.

Europe 
As per Coin ATM Radar, there are 1,026 Bitcoin ATMs across the European Union member area. The nations of the Union with the highest number of Bitcoin ATMs are Spain (174), Austria (133), Poland (114), Romania (87), Czechia (69), Greece (63) and Italy (60).

United States
According to Coin ATM Radar, there were more than 24,700 bitcoin ATMs in the US as of September 2021, up from 2,342 in Jan 2018. Some small shop owners earning a reported $300 a month for rental space. 

Most US cryptocurrency ATMS charge transaction fees between 6.5% and 20%. Several bitcoin ATM companies, including the two largest bitcoin ATM companies Bitcoin Depot and Coin Cloud, charge this fee as a percentage of an exchange rate that is significantly less favorable to customers than market rate. This functionally adds an additional 20% fee for using bitcoin ATMs. According to comments made by Bitcoin Depot to its investors, the company specifically targets middle and lower income areas for placement of bitcoin ATMs. The company also attempts to minimize its own exposure to cryptocurrency as a volatile asset.

In February 2023, Cash Cloud, the company which operates the Coin Cloud ATMs, filed for bankruptcy. This was due to the company's exposure to Genesis Capital and the cryptocurrency crash which started in 2021. In March 2023, three people were arrested for operating 51 bitcoin ATMS in Northeast Ohio. The trio were charged with multiple violations, including money laundering, licensing violations, and receiving stolen property.

Several analysts and regulators have compared US bitcoin ATMs to payday loans, as both are poverty industries which increase the cost of poverty by charging significantly higher fees to people who lack access to mainstream banking.

Some bitcoin ATMs operating in the US are imported from other countries; for example, Czech company General Bytes sold thousands of their machines to operators operating in US. Through Coinme, bitcoin can be exchanged in the United States for local currency at ATMs located in select MoneyGram locations and Coinstar machines.

South Africa 

In South Africa, ATMs accept the Rand (ZAR) and transactions over 10,000ZAR ($667) require ID verification. These ATMs are mostly found in Cape Town, Durban, Johannesburg and Pretoria.

Compliance
Bitcoin ATM operators need to adjust the limits on deposits and withdrawals according to AML/KYC standards applicable in the jurisdiction where their ATMs are placed. In some countries / states this requires a money transmitter license.

In the United States, the Bank Secrecy Act (BSA) requires Bitcoin ATM operators to establish and maintain an effective written AML program reasonably designed to prevent ATM machines from being used to facilitate money laundering and the financing of terrorist activities. Bitcoin ATM operators must be registered as Money Service Businesses and are regulated by the Financial Crimes Enforcement Network.

In March 2022, the Financial Conduct Authority (FCA) in the United Kingdom declared that all cryptocurrency ATMs in the country were illegal and would need to be shut down. None of the ATM's operators had successfully registered with the agency. The FCA cited a failure to comply with know your customer laws (KYC), which track and prevent money laundering, as well as the high risk to customers, due to a lack of regulation and protection. At the time, Coin ATM Radar listed 81 such ATMs in the country.

See also
Digital currency
Cryptocurrency
Cryptocurrencies in Europe

References

External links

Bitcoin
Computer-related introductions in 2013
Automated teller machines